The Leavenworth Ski Hill is a small ski area and an historic district located at the end of Ski Hill Drive in Leavenworth, Washington, United States. The facility is located inside the Wenatchee National Forest. Operated by Leavenworth Winter Sports Club, the facility includes two small downhill ski hills, 26 km of cross-country ski trails, a ski jump, and a tubing hill.

The Leavenworth Ski Hill Historic District was added to National Register of Historic Places in 2013. It encompasses a  area, comprising a total of 5 contributing properties and 3 non-contributing properties. The contributing properties are:
 The Ski Hill site itself
 The 2 ½ story Ski Hill Lodge built in 1936
 The 90-meter (Class A) Bakke Hill Sky Jump originally built in 1930 and rebuilt in 1957
 The Men's Restroom built c. 1938
 The Ticket Booth, formerly a garage, built in 1940

References

External links
 Leavenworth Winter Sports Club - official site

Buildings and structures in Chelan County, Washington
Ski areas and resorts in Washington (state)
Tourist attractions in Chelan County, Washington
Historic districts on the National Register of Historic Places in Washington (state)